Eusébio is a Brazilian municipality in the state of Ceará, in the Northeast region of the country. Located in the Metropolitan Region of Fortaleza, 24 kilometers from the capital, it has 79 km² of land area and an estimated population of 54,337 inhabitants, according to estimates by the Brazilian Institute of Geography and Statistics in 2020. The access route is CE-040.

References

External links
 of the municipal administration

Municipalities in Ceará